

 
Mount Zeil is a locality in the Northern Territory of Australia located about  south of the territory capital of Darwin.

The locality consists of the following land:
The Derwent pastoral lease in the north-west
The Narwietooma pastoral lease in the north-east
The Glen Helen pastoral lease in the south-west, and  
The north-west part of the West MacDonnell National Park in the south-east.

The locality’s boundaries and name were gazetted on 4 April 2007. It is named after the mountain of the same name which is located within its boundaries.

The 2016 Australian census which was conducted in August 2016 reports that Mount Zeil had 83 people living within its boundaries.

Mount Zeil is located within the federal division of Lingiari, the territory electoral division of Stuart and the local government area of the MacDonnell Region.

References

Populated places in the Northern Territory
MacDonnell Region